Diplacothrips is a genus of thrips in the family Phlaeothripidae.

Species
 Diplacothrips borgmeieri
 Diplacothrips piceus

References

Phlaeothripidae
Thrips
Thrips genera